Richard Cartwright Austin (born 1934 in Cleveland, Ohio) is an American writer and environmental theologian.

Gaining experience

Early life
Austin was raised in Washington, DC, in a politically active family. He received a Bachelor of Arts from Swarthmore College in 1956, a Master of Divinity from Union Theological Seminary in 1959, and a Doctor of the Science of Theology from San Francisco Theological Seminary in 1975.

Pastor and teacher
Austin served a five-church Presbyterian parish in a rural mining area of Pennsylvania, then served as associate pastor of the Georgetown Presbyterian Church in Washington DC. In 1966, he was appointed Director of the West Virginia Mountain Project, his denomination's largest Appalachian mission, in the Big Coal River Valley of West Virginia. From 1975 until his retirement in 1999, Austin had a special ministry in Environmental Theology with the Presbyterian Church. His base was a mountain farm in southwestern Virginia, near Dungannon.

In the 1970s and 1980s, Austin spoke to Protestant, Catholic, Evangelical and Eastern Orthodox groups across the United States, and trained young ministers in environmental awareness through the ecumenical Appalachian Ministries Educational Resource Center in Berea, Kentucky. For this work Austin was honored in 1999 by Wilson College with a Doctor of Humane Letters degree.

Advocating
Austin based his early books on his experiences among Appalachian people advocating against strip mining for coal. Al Gore wrote about Austin's experiences in Earth in the Balance:

Austin led a campaign to abolish strip mining in West Virginia in 1971, then co-chaired the national coalition Citizens to Abolish Strip Mining that lobbied U.S. Congress to pass anti-strip-mining legislation. President Jimmy Carter signed the Surface Mining Control and Reclamation Act in 1977.

From 1977 to 1982, Austin turned his attention to a more local issue. American Electric Power planned to build America's largest pumped-storage hydroelectric facility at Brumley Gap in southwestern Virginia. Austin led the Coalition of American Electric Consumers that forced American Electric Power to withdraw its plans.

Family
Austin is married to Anne Leibig, a gestalt psychotherapist. He has three sons from a previous marriage, and six grandchildren.

Writing career

Environmental theology
Between 1987 and 1990, Austin's four-book series, Environmental Theology, was published by John Knox Press and Creekside Press. Baptized into Wilderness explores the spirituality of John Muir. Beauty of the Lord draws from the American theologian Jonathan Edwards to propose an understanding of beauty that is relational rather than aesthetic, and that strengthens our experiences of God with experiences of nature. Hope for the Land explores Biblical texts that affirm human responsibility to liberate land from oppression. Reclaiming America proposes land reform, civil rights for natural life and new approaches to agriculture.

The author Chris Bolgiano summarized Austin's philosophy in Living in the Appalachian Forest:

Moral imagination
Austin's second series, Moral Imagination in Industrial Culture, draws upon his family history to explore Christian responses to the challenges of industrialization during the past two centuries. Books in the series include Building Utopia: Erecting Russia's First Modern City, East of Cleveland, Dreams and Depression, and The Measure of All Things. In addition, Austin edited two other books as part of the series: Letters from the Pacific, a Combat Chaplain in World War II and Give God a Flower.

References

External links 
 Creekside Press

Living people
1934 births
American theologians
Writers from Cleveland
Writers from Washington, D.C.
Swarthmore College alumni
San Francisco Theological Seminary alumni